The Gang of Four was a political faction of four Chinese Communist Party officials, prominent during the Cultural Revolution 1966–1976.

Gang of Four may also refer to:

Arts and entertainment
 Gang of Four (band), an English post-punk band
 Gang of Four (board game), by Days of Wonder
 Gang of Four, 2004 novel by Liz Byrski
 Gang of Four (film), a 1989 French film

Political groups 
 Gang of Four (Afghanistan): Aslam Watanjar, Sayed Muhammad Gulabzoy, Sherjan Mazdoryar, Asadullah Sarwar 
 Gang of Four (Australian Labor Party): Kevin Rudd, Julia Gillard, Wayne Swan, Lindsay Tanner
 Gang of Four (Australian Democrats): Lyn Allison, John Cherry, Andrew Murray, Aden Ridgeway
 Gang of Four (Harlem), U.S.: David Dinkins, Basil Paterson, Charles Rangel, Percy Sutton
 Gang of Four (Pakistan): two different uses to describe four generals
 Gang of Four (Papua New Guinea): Mekere Morauta, Charles Lepani, Rabbie Namaliu and Anthony Siaguru
 Gang of Four (pro-Contra) in the U.S.: Bernard W. Aronson, Bruce P. Cameron, Robert S. Leiken, Penn Kemble
 Gang of Four (SDP), UK: four politicians who founded the Social Democratic Party
 Gang of Four (Seattle), U.S.: Bernie Whitebear, Bob Santos, Roberto Maestas, Larry Gossett
 Gang of Four in Colorado, U.S., or the Four Horsemen: Pat Stryker, Jared Polis, Tim Gill, Rutt Bridges

Other groups 
 Big Four tech companies, or Gang of Four: Alphabet, Amazon, Apple and Meta
 Gang of Four (software), authors of computing book Design Patterns
 Gang of Four (Cisco, DEC, StrataCom and Nortel) who set a standard for a Local Management Interface in networking
 Gang of Four paper by Kreps, Milgrom, Roberts and Wilson, about game theory and reputation formation

See also
 
 Big Four (disambiguation)
 Four Asian Tigers: the economies of Hong Kong, Singapore, South Korea and Taiwan
 Four group (disambiguation)
 Gang of 14, a bipartisan group of U.S. Senators in the 109th Congress